Darío Raúl Antonio Díaz (born July 13, 1981 in San Fernando del Valle de Catamarca) is an Argentine professional racing cyclist, who currently rides for UCI Continental team .

Major results

2003
 1st  Road race, National Under-23 Road Championships
2005
 1st Prologue Vuelta a San Juan
2007
 1st Overall Giro del Sol San Juan
 Vuelta a Mendoza
1st Prologue, Stages 1, 2, 3 & 5
 2nd Overall Vuelta a San Juan
1st Stages 5, 6, 8 & 10
 2nd Subida a El Jumeal
2008
 1st Overall Doble Calingasta
 1st Stage 1 Vuelta a San Juan
 4th Road race, National Road Championships
2011
 Rutas de América
1st Stages 1 & 3
 2nd Overall Vuelta del Uruguay
1st Stages 1, 2, 8, 9, 10 & 11
2012
 1st  Road race, National Road Championships
 Vuelta del Uruguay
1st Stages 4 & 9
2013
 Vuelta a San Juan
1st Stages 1 & 2
2015
 1st  Sprints classification Vuelta del Uruguay
2016
 1st Stage 6 Vuelta a San Juan
2020
 3rd Overall Giro del Sol San Juan
1st Stage 1

References

External links

Overview

1981 births
Living people
Argentine male cyclists
People from Catamarca Province